The Postmaster General of Sri Lanka is the appointed head of Sri Lanka Post, which is a government department. The current Postmaster General is Ranjith Ariyaratne.

History
The first mail service in Ceylon, was in 1788, established by the Dutch East India Company between Holland and Batavia via the Cape of Good Hope and Dutch Ceylon. They established postal offices in the coastal trading centres of Colombo, Galle, Jaffna and Mannar. In 1795 the Dutch were expelled by the British and the Maritime Provinces were initially administered by the British East India Company. Two years later Ceylon became a Crown Colony. In 1798, a British officer, Captain Kennedy, was appointed as a competent postal authority.

In 1815, following the signing of the Kandyan Convention the British took control of the entire country. They re-organised the postal service and a permanent post office was established in Colombo in 1882. The first official Post Master General of Ceylon was Egbert Bletterman, who was the PMG for the whole island. In 1817, Lewis Sansoni succeeded Bletterman as the second Postmaster General. The third Postmaster General was Major George Stewart and during his period he was instrumental in extending the postal services to major towns in the country.

List of Postmasters General of Sri Lanka

See also
Sri Lanka Post

External links & reference
Sri Lanka Post

Specific

 
Postal system of Sri Lanka